Verkehrsbetriebe STI (Steffisburg-Thun-Interlaken) is a bus operator in the Swiss canton of Bern. It is a private company based in the city of Thun, and operates bus services in that city, as well as routes linking Thun with the neighbouring towns and villages including the tourist hubs of Interlaken and Steffisburg.

The company also manages the Thunersee–Beatenberg Funicular and the Seilbahnen Beatenberg-Niederhorn.

History
 
 
STI was formed in December 1911, originally as the Elektrische Bahn Steffisburg-Thun-Interlaken (English: Steffisburg–Thun–Interlaken Electric Railway), and began carrying passengers on 10 October 1913, with the opening of a tram line between Steffisburg and Oberhofen (via Thun), which was later extended to Beatenbucht and finally to Interlaken. Plans for road rebuilding led to the closure of the Beatenbucht–Interlaken section of tramway in 1939, but trams continued to provide the Thun–Beatenbucht service, STI's main line, until 1952.  The Thun–Steffisburg tram line closed in 1958, and since then the STI network has been covered exclusively by buses. Trolleybuses, powered by electricity drawn from overhead wires, were used on the main line, Thun–Beatenbucht, connecting at Beatenbucht with the Thunersee–Beatenberg funicular and with a motorbus route covering the section to Interlaken. In 1982, the trolleybuses were replaced with conventional, diesel-powered buses. STI introduced its first night service in 1993, between Thun and Bern. Further extensions made to the network in 1999 and 2001 took STI buses into areas such as Gwatt, which had seen railway station closures.

Fleet
As of January 2014 the fleet consisted of 65 vehicles

Colors
Since its 100th anniversary the STI vehicles are painted in a light yellow and an anthracite.

References

External links

Official site
Ferrovie, with images of STI vehicles

Bus companies of Switzerland
Public transport in Switzerland
Transport in Thun
Transport in Interlaken